Oddvar Hallset Reiakvam (born 4 June 1985) is a Norwegian politician for the Progress Party.

He served as a deputy representative to the Norwegian Parliament from Sogn og Fjordane during the terms 2005–2009 and 2009–2013. In total he met during 56 days of parliamentary session.

External links

1985 births
Living people
Deputy members of the Storting
Progress Party (Norway) politicians
Sogn og Fjordane politicians
Place of birth missing (living people)
21st-century Norwegian politicians